Bromley Football Club is an football club based in Bromley, Greater London, England. Bromley FC are the current holders of the FA Trophy, defeating Wrexham A.F.C 1-0 in the final; the goal was scored by Michael Cheek.

History
Established in 1892, Bromley initially played in the South London League, before becoming a founder member of the Southern League in 1894, joining Division Two. However, after finishing bottom of Division Two in 1895–96 they left to become founder members of the London League, also joining Division Two. They won the division at the first attempt and were promoted to Division One. They switched to the Kent League for the 1898–99 season, but after finishing bottom of the league, they returned to Division One of the London League. During the 1899–1900 season, the club withdrew from Division One, taking over their reserves' fixtures in Division Two. They withdrew from Division Two at the end of the 1900–01 season.

In 1907 the club were founder members of the Spartan League and went on to become its inaugural champions. They joined the Isthmian League for the following season, and won back-to-back titles in 1908–09 and 1909–10. In 1910–11 the club won the FA Amateur Cup, beating Bishop Auckland 1–0 in the final. The season also saw them finish seventh in 1910–11, the club returned to the Kent League and were placed in Division One. They remained in the league until World War I, but joined the Athenian League when football resumed in 1919. The club were Athenian League champions in 1922–23. In 1937–38 they reached the first round of the FA Cup for the first time. After beating King's Lynn in the first round, they lost 4–1 at Scarborough in the second. They also reached the final of the FA Amateur Cup again, beating Erith & Belvedere 1–0. The club repeated the feat the following season, this time playing Football League opposition for the first time as they lost 8–1 at Lincoln City in the second round. In 1945–46 another second round appearance resulted in a 4–2 aggregate defeat to Watford. In 1947–48 they held Reading to a 1–1 draw in the first round, before losing the replay at Elm Park 3–0.

The club won another Athenian League title and the FA Amateur Cup in 1948–49, with the following season seeing another FA first round defeat, this time 2–1 to Watford. In 1950–51 the club won their third Athenian League title; the season also saw them lose 1–0 to Aldershot in the FA Cup first round. Going straight into the first round the following season, they lost 3–2 at Torquay United. In 1952 they rejoined the Isthmian League, and after finishing as runners-up in their first season back in the league, they were champions in 1953–54. They won the league for a fourth time in 1960–61.

After finishing bottom of Division One in the 1974–75 season Bromley were relegated to Division Two. In 1976–77 the club appeared in the FA Cup first round for the first time in over twenty years, losing 7–0 at Swindon Town. Division Two became Division One in 1977, and the club were promoted to the Premier Division after finishing as runners-up in 1979–80. They were relegated to Division One again in 1983–84, but returned to the Premier Division as Division One runners-up in 1985–86. Another relegation followed in 1989–90, but was followed by an immediate return to the Premier Division as Division One runners-up in 1990–91. In 1996–97 they qualified for the FA Cup first round again, but were beaten 3–1 at home by Enfield.

Bromley were relegated to Division One again at the end of the 1998–99 season; non-league reorganisation in 2004 saw Division One become the eighth rather than seventh tier of the football pyramid. A fourth-place finish that season saw them qualify for the promotion play-offs, and after defeating Metropolitan Police on penalties in the semi-finals, they beat Horsham 3–1 in the final to earn promotion to the Premier Division. In 2006–07 they finished as runners-up in the Premier Division, again qualifying for the promotion play-offs. A 1–0 win over AFC Wimbledon in the semi-finals and a victory against Billericay Town on penalties in the final saw them promoted to the Conference South. The season had also seen them reach the FA Cup first round again, eventually losing 4–1 at Gillingham. Further appearances in the first round were achieved in 2009–10 (against Colchester United), 2011–12 (Leyton Orient), 2012–13 (Fleetwood Town) and 2014–15 (Dartford), but they were beaten on each occasion.

In 2014–15 Bromley won the Conference South, earning promotion to the renamed National League, where they have remained since. Another FA Cup first round appearance in 2017–18 saw them defeated by Rochdale. The season also saw them reach the final of the FA Trophy, where they lost 5–4 on penalties to Brackley Town after the match had ended in a 1–1 draw. The club won the FA Trophy for the first time in their history in 2021–22, beating Wrexham 1–0 in the final.

Ground

The club initially played at the Queensmead Recreation Ground, before moving to Glebe Road. Seven years later they moved to the Plaistow Cricket Club ground when Glebe Road was bought for use as housing. However, the cricket club's ground was also obtained for housing in 1904, leading to the football club (and the other sports club using the ground) moving to a site on Hayes Lane. The new ground was opened on 3 September 1904.

In 1938 the club moved to the current Hayes Lane ground. The record attendance of 10,798 was set during a game against a Nigeria XI in September 1948. The ground currently has a capacity of 5,150, of which 1,300 is seated and 2,500 is covered.

Current squad

Out on loan

Coaching staff

Honours
FA Trophy
Winners 2021–22
National League South
Champions 2014–15
Isthmian League
Champions 1908–09, 1909–10, 1953–54, 1960–61
Athenian League
Champions 1922–23, 1948–49, 1950–51
Spartan League
Champions 1907–08
London League
Division Two champions 1896–97
FA Amateur Cup
Winners 1910–11, 1937–38, 1948–49
London Senior Cup
Winners 1909–10, 1945–46, 1950–51, 2002–03, 2012–13
Kent Senior Cup
Winners 1949–50, 1976–77, 1991–92, 1996–97, 2005–06, 2006–07
London Challenge Cup
Winners 1995–96
Kent Floodlit Trophy
Winners 1978–79
Kent Amateur Cup
Winners 1907–08, 1931–32, 1935–36, 1936–37, 1938–39, 1946–47, 1948–49, 1950–51, 1952–53, 1953–54, 1954–55, 1959–60

Records
Best FA Cup performance: Second round, 1937–38, 1938–39, 1945–46
Best FA Trophy performance: Winners 2021–22
Record attendance: 10,789 vs Nigeria XI, 24 September 1948
Biggest victory: 13–1 vs Redhill, Athenian League, 1945–46
Heaviest defeat: 11–1 vs Barking, Athenian League, 1933–34
Most appearances: George Brown (1938–1961)
Most goals: George Brown, 570 (1938–1961)
Record transfer fee received: Undisclosed sum from Portsmouth for Reeco Hackett-Fairchild, January 2020

In popular culture
Lifelong fan Dave Roberts wrote three books on his experiences following Bromley FC: The Bromley Boys (2008), 32 Programmes (2011)  and Home and Away (2016). The Bromley Boys has also been made into a film available on DVD and via streaming, starring Martine McCutcheon, Alan Davies and Jamie Foreman.

See also
Bromley F.C. players
Bromley F.C. managers

References

External links

Official website

 
Football clubs in England
Football clubs in London
Sport in the London Borough of Bromley
1892 establishments in England
Association football clubs established in 1892
Southern Football League clubs
London League (football)
Kent Football League (1894–1959)
Spartan League
Isthmian League
Athenian League
National League (English football) clubs